The Ottawa Mint sovereign is a British one pound coin (known as a sovereign) minted between 1908 and 1919 at the Ottawa Mint (known today as the Ottawa branch of the Royal Canadian Mint. This has augmented debate among Canadian numismatists because some view these pieces as Canadian while others view them as British and thus distinct from the decimal series of Canadian coinage.  Since the opening of the Ottawa Mint, the Dominion of Canada’s government wanted to produce decimal gold coins.  As it was a branch of the Royal Mint, it was obligated to mint sovereigns on request.  When sovereigns were requested, it was usually for export causes. 

The sovereign’s value was set at “four dollars and eighty-six cents and two-thirds of a cent” by the Currency Act of 1910, and made legal tender in Canada along with divisions of the sovereign. One Canadian dollar was therefore worth 15/73 of a sovereign.

Edward VII
The various branch mints produced sovereigns for the Royal Mint. A mint mark distinguished the Ottawa Mint’s production of the sovereigns. All sovereigns produced in Ottawa had a “C” mint mark to signify that it was produced in Canada. The sovereigns of 1908 were Specimen coins only and its tiny mintage was struck merely to establish the series.  The production for the circulation of sovereigns began in 1909.

George V
The mintages for the sovereigns produced at the Ottawa Mint were modest. The total of all Ottawa Mint sovereigns barely equalled the yearly mintage compared to the London, England branch of the Royal Mint and the Australian branches of the Royal Mint.  The Ottawa Mint’s highest output for sovereigns was in 1911 when it produced 256,946. The rarest Ottawa Mint sovereign is the 1916. Only 50 pieces are known to exist today, and there is no evidence to explain why there is such a low amount in existence.  

Until the last few years, the 1916 sovereign that was minted in London, England was rare as well, but thousands were released from a British bank. Another tale is that the 1916 Ottawa Mint sovereigns were lost at sea on its way to England during World War I. This is quickly dismissed because Canada could have deposited the gold with the New York Federal Reserve for the account of Great Britain.

References

Coins of Canada